Geochang Yoo clan is one of the Korean clans. Their Bon-gwan is in Geochang County, South Gyeongsang Province. According to the research held in 1985, the number of Geochang Yoo clan’s member was 32790. Their founder was  who was 41 th children of Emperor Gaozu of Han, Song dynasty’s first emperor.  was good at Neo-Confucianism and writing.  worked as the minister of defense (兵部尚書, Bingbu Shangshu), a government post, in Song dynasty and entered Goryeo as one of Eight Scholars in 1082. Then, he was settled in Gyeongsang Province.

See also 
 Korean clan names of foreign origin

References

External links 
 

 
Yu clans
Korean clan names of Chinese origin